Vladislav Kormtshikov (Vladislav Kormshchikov, born 15 July 1967) is a Russian ski-orienteering competitor and world champion. He received a gold medal in the long distance at the 2000 World Ski Orienteering Championships in Krasnoyarsk.

References

1967 births
Living people
Russian orienteers
Male orienteers
Ski-orienteers